In England, spatial planning is undertaken at the national level, through the National Planning Policy Framework. The London region is the only one to have a statutory London Plan. Most planning functions are exercised by local authorities, with neighbourhood planning also taking place in some areas.

National planning
Since March 2012 there has been a consolidated National Planning Policy Framework.

Regional planning
Regional planning in England was undertaken for each of the nine regions.  Although some coordination of central and local government activities existed from the 1960s onwards, it only had a statutory basis between the 1990s and 2010.

Recognisable cases of regional planning emerged in England during the 1920s as urban growth increasingly overrode boundaries of local authorities, which in several cases  found cause to cooperate over common planning issues. In the later stages of the Second World War the government fostered significant plans for Greater London and the West Midlands in particular, preparing for post-war reconstruction. More significant elements of regional development and economic planning began to be established in England from the mid-1960s onwards. In most of the standard regions, Economic Planning Councils and Boards were set up, comprising appointed members from local authorities, business, trade unions and universities. Associated with projections of large national population growth and following tensions over urban expansion between the large cities and their surrounding counties, in the early 1970s there were produced a number of regional and sub-regional planning studies.  The government-sponsored regional institutions continued to operate until abolished by the incoming Conservative government in 1979.  However, by the mid-1980s continuing urban growth and allied difficulties caused local authorities in most regions to establish standing conferences to consider regional planning issues.  Regional initiatives were bolstered by the 1986 Government Green Paper and 1989 White Paper on The Future of Development Plans, which proposed the introduction of strong regional guidance within the planning system, and by the Government's issuing of Strategic Guidance at a regional level, later termed Regional Planning Guidance (RPG), from 1986 onwards.

In the eight English regions outside London, regional assemblies were formed in 1998, and were responsible for physical planning policy through Regional Spatial Strategies (RSS).  From 1999, Regional Development Agencies co-ordinated initiatives to improve economic development.  The assemblies were effectively replaced by smaller Local Authority Leaders’ Boards between 2008 and 2010, and formally abolished on 31 March 2010.

In June 2010, the incoming Coalition Government announced its intentions to abolish regional spatial strategies and return spatial planning powers to local government.  In March 2011, the all-party Commons Communities and Local Government Committee published its report on the implications of the abolition of the RSS system.  It stated that: "The intended abolition of regional spatial planning strategies leaves a vacuum at the heart of the English planning system which could have profound social, economic and environmental consequences set to last for many years."

London Plan
Since 2000 the Mayor of London is required to produce a London Plan that is published by the Greater London Authority.

See also
Local planning authority
Neighbourhood planning in England

References

 
Town and country planning in England